Spencer Leniu (born 8 September 2000) is a Samoa international rugby league footballer who plays as a  for the Penrith Panthers in the National Rugby League (NRL).

Background
Leniu was born in Auckland, New Zealand. Leniu grew up in Sydney, Australia and played for the Minchinbury Jets in the Penrith District Junior Rugby League.

Career

2019
Leniu made his first grade debut for Penrith against the Cronulla-Sutherland Sharks in round 21 of the 2019 NRL season which ended in a 26-20 victory for Penrith at Panthers Stadium.

2020
Leniu played 12 games for Penrith in the 2020 NRL season but did not feature in the clubs finals campaign or the 2020 NRL Grand Final loss to Melbourne.

2021
Leniu played a total of 19 games for Penrith in the 2021 NRL season including the club's 2021 NRL Grand Final victory over South Sydney.

2022
Leniu played 25 games for Penrith in the 2022 NRL season including the clubs 2022 NRL Grand Final victory over Parramatta.

In October Leniu was named in the Samoa squad for the 2021 Rugby League World Cup.

2023
On 18 February, Leniu played in Penrith's 13-12 upset loss to St Helens RFC in the 2023 World Club Challenge. On February, Leniu announced he will join Sydney Roosters from 2024 onwards.

References

External links

Panthers profile
Samoa profile

2000 births
Living people
New Zealand rugby league players
New Zealand sportspeople of Samoan descent
Rugby league players from Auckland
Penrith Panthers players
Rugby league props
Samoa national rugby league team players